Abies homolepis, the Nikko fir (in Japanese ウラジロモミ, urajiro-momi) is a fir native to the mountains of central and southern Honshū and Shikoku, Japan. It grows at altitudes of 700–2,200 m, often in temperate rain forest with high rainfall and cool, humid summers, and heavy winter snowfall.

It is a medium-sized to large evergreen coniferous tree growing to 30–40 m tall with a trunk diameter of up to 1.5 m. The leaves are needle-like, flattened, 1.5–3.5 cm long and 2–3 mm wide by 0.5 mm thick, glossy green above, and with two white bands of stomata below, and rounded or slightly notched at the tip. The leaf arrangement is spiral on the shoot, but with each leaf variably twisted at the base so they lie partially flattened to either side of and above the shoot, with few below the shoot. The shoots are yellow-buff, glabrous, and often conspicuously grooved. The cones are 6–12 cm long and 3–4 cm broad, purple-blue before maturity; the scale bracts are short, and hidden in the closed cone. The winged seeds are released when the cones disintegrate at maturity about 6–7 months after pollination.

Uses
Nikko fir wood is used for general structural timber. Outside Japan, it is grown as an ornamental tree in northern Europe and North America.

It is also a popular forest tree since it is resistant to air pollution.

References

 
Liu, T. S. (1971). A Monograph of the genus Abies. National Taiwan University.

External links

 Conifers Around the World: Abies homolepis - Nikko Fir.

homolepis
Endemic flora of Japan
Trees of Japan
Least concern plants
Ornamental trees